The following Union Army units and commanders were the initial structure on April 4, 1862 of the Union Department of the Potomac during the Peninsula campaign of the American Civil War. This list includes units deployed to the Virginia Peninsula, and those that remained in the Washington area. The Confederate order of battle is listed separately.

Abbreviations used

Military rank
 MG = Major General
 BG = Brigadier General
 Col = Colonel
 Ltc = Lieutenant Colonel
 Maj = Major
 Cpt = Captain
 Lt = Lieutenant

Army of the Potomac

The following units were the initial organization of the Army of the Potomac on the peninsula.

MG George B. McClellan, Commanding

Headquarters and Body Guard
 Co. A, 4th U.S. Cavalry: Lt James B. McIntire
 Co. E, 4th U.S. Cavalry: Lt William O'Connell
 Oneida Independent Cavalry Company: Cpt Daniel P. Mann
 Sturges' Rifles: Cpt James Steele
Provost Guard
 2nd U.S. Cavalry: Maj Alfred Pleasonton
 Battalion of 8th U.S. Infantry (Cos. F & G) and 17th U.S. Infantry (Cos. B & D): Maj George L. Willard

Staff
Col Randolph B. Marcy, Chief of Staff

Maj Granville O. Haller, Commandant of General Headquarters

II Corps

BG Edwin Sumner, Commanding
 Ltc Joseph H. Taylor, Adjutant

N.B. The Third Division under BG Louis Blenker was detached in early April and transferred to the Mountain Department

III Corps

BG Samuel P. Heintzelman, Commanding
  Cpt Chauncey McKeever, Chief of Staff

Porter's Division was combined with Sykes' Division of the Reserve Corps and McCall's Division of the First Corps to form the Fifth Corps (Provisional) on May 18, 1862.

IV Corps

BG Erasmus D. Keyes, Commanding
  Ltc Charles C. Suydam

W.F. Smith's Division was combined with Franklin's Division of the First Corps to form the Sixth Corps (Provisional) on May 18, 1862.

Reserves

Sykes' Division was combined with Porter's Division of the Third Corps and McCall's Division of the First Corps to form the Fifth Corps (Provisional) on May 18, 1862.

Other Troops from the Department of the Potomac
The following troops were part of the Department of the Potomac in March and April 1861, but were detached to maintain defense of the Potomac River line.

I Corps

On April 4, the First Corps was renamed the Department of the Rappahannock, with authority to include the District of Columbia, Maryland between the Potomac and Patuxent, and Virginia between the Blue Ridge and the Fredericksburg & Richmond Railroad.

MG Irvin McDowell, Commanding
  Ltc Edmund Schriver, Chief of Staff

Unattached cavalry
 1st New York Cavalry: Col Andrew T. McReynolds
 2nd New York Cavalry: Col J. Mansfield Davies
 4th New York Cavalry: Col Christian F. Dickel
Sharpshooters
 2nd Regiment, Berdan Sharpshooters: Col Henry A.V. Post

McCall's Division transferred to the Peninsula and was combined with Porter's Division of the Third Corps and Sykes' Division of the Reserve Corps to form the Fifth Corps (Provisional) on May 18, 1862. Franklin's Division transferred to the Peninsula and was combined with W.F. Smith's Division of the Fourth Corps to form the Sixth Corps (Provisional) on May 18, 1862.

V Corps

On April 4, the Fifth Corps was renamed the Department of Shenandoah with authority over Maryland between the Blue Ridge and Flintstone Creek, Virginia between the Blue Ridge and the modern-day border with West Virginia.

MG Nathaniel P. Banks, Commanding
  Cpt Louis H. Pelouze, Acting Assistant Adjutant General

Unattached Infantry
 28th Pennsylvania: Col John W. Geary
 4th Regiment Potomac Home Brigade (Maryland): ?

Shields' Division was transferred to the Department of the Rappahannock on May 10, 1862

District of Washington
BG James S. Wadsworth, Commanding

Railroad Guards
  Col Dixon S. Miles
 6th New York Cavalry (Cos. A, B, C, E, G, I, K, & M dismounted): Col Thomas Devin
 10th New York Cavalry (dismounted): Col John Lemmon
 11th New York Cavalry (dismounted): Col James B. Swain
 2nd Pennsylvania Cavalry (dismounted): Col Richard Butler Price

Troops Around Baltimore
On March 22, the Middle Department was created with authority over Pennsylvania, New Jersey, Delaware, and the Eastern Shore of Maryland and Virginia, as well as the Maryland counties of Cecil, Hartford, Baltimore, and Anne Arundel. Dix remained in command.

MG John A. Dix, Commanding
  Maj Daniel Tompkins Van Buren, Chief of Staff and Acting Assistant Adjutant General

Department of Virginia
The Department of Virginia constituted an area 60 miles from Fort Monroe. McClellan had received permission to absorb it into his army as a division of the First Corps, but it was rescinded shortly after he arrived on the Peninsula.

MG John E. Wool, Commanding

References
 Troops of the Army of the Potomac sent to the Peninsula in March and early in April, 1862 The War of the Rebellion: A Compilation of the Official Records of the Union and Confederate Armies. United States War Department.  Series I, Volume V, Chapter XXIV, pp. 19–32.  (1881) 
 Additional Aides-de-Camp The New York Times. January 11, 1862.
 

American Civil War orders of battle
Peninsula campaign
Union Army